André Guinier (1 August 1911 – 3 July 2000) was a French physicist who did important work in the field of X-ray diffraction and solid-state physics. He worked at the Conservatoire National des Arts et Métiers, then taught at the University of Paris and later at the University of Paris-Sud in Orsay, where he co-founded the Laboratory of Solid State Physics. He was elected to the French Academy of Sciences in 1971 and won the Gregori Aminoff Prize in 1985.

In the field of small-angle scattering he discovered the relationship of particle size to intensity which is called Guinier's Law. He developed the Guinier camera for use in X-ray diffraction and contributed to the development of the electron microprobe by Raimond Castaing.

Together with Prof George Dawson Preston he also gives his name to the Guinier-Preston zone

Publications
Guinier, André (1955) Small-angle scattering of X-rays. OCLC number: 01646250.
Guinier, André  (1963). "X-ray Diffraction. In Crystals, Imperfect Crystals, and Amorphous Bodies". W. H. Freeman and Co.

See also
Electron microprobe

References

Sources
Obituary published in Acta Crystallographica
Ravy S. André Guinier (1911–2000): a physicist among crystallographers //Physica Scripta. – 2015. – Т. 90. – №. 3. – С. 38001-38004.

External links
His recollections of his early work
His personal remembrances for the book "50 Years of X-ray Diffraction" (pg. 574)

French physicists
1911 births
2000 deaths
Academic staff of the University of Paris
Academic staff of Paris-Sud University
Members of the French Academy of Sciences